The 2019 League of Legends World Championship was an esports tournament for the multiplayer online battle arena video game League of Legends. It was the ninth iteration of the League of Legends World Championship, an annual international tournament organized by the game's developer, Riot Games. It was held from October 2, 2019, to November 10, 2019, in Berlin, Madrid and Paris. Twenty four teams from 13 regions qualified for the tournament based on their placement in regional circuits such as those in China, Europe, North America, South Korea and Taiwan/Hong Kong/Macau with twelve of those teams having to reach the main event via a play-in stage.

"Phoenix" was the tournament's theme song, put together by Chrissy Costanza and Cailin Russo, while Blanke, Carpenter Brut, and 1788-L produced their own remix versions of "Phoenix". A virtual rap group named "True Damage" was unveiled by Riot Games during the ceremony, with Soyeon from (G)I-dle, Duckwrth, Thutmose, Keke Palmer and Becky G representing the group as its human counterpart and in the live performance of their debut song, "Giants", in the finals.

Qualified teams and rosters

Qualified teams 
Based on the results of the Mid-Season Invitational and the World Championship in the year prior, with the 2018 MSI victory of Royal Never Give Up and 2018 Worlds victory of Invictus Gaming, the third seed team from China (LPL) will start in the group stage, replacing the third seed team from South Korea (LCK) that will now instead begin in the play-in stage. Due to the merger of Latin America North's and Latin America South's professional leagues into a single league (LLA) and the results of the 2019 Mid-Season Invitational, Vietnam (VCS) will have a direct spot in the group stage for the summer champions and an additional spot in the play-in stage for the summer runner-up, the same format used in 2017 Worlds. The summer champions of Taiwan/Hong Kong/Macau (LMS) have also been dropped to pool #2.

Rosters 
 Player didn't play any games.

Venues 
Berlin, Madrid, Paris were the three cities chosen to host the competition.

Play-in stage 
 Venue: LEC Studio, Berlin, Germany.

Round 1 
 Date and time: October 2–5, began at 13:00 CEST (UTC+02:00) in the first leg and 12:00 in the second. 
 Twelve teams are drawn into four groups, with three teams in each group.
 Double round robin, all matches are best-of-one.
 If teams have same win–loss record and head to head, they will play a tie-breaker match for first or second-place.
 The top two teams of each group advance to the second round. The third-place team is eliminated.

Group A 

Tiebreaker placement was based on the combined game times of teams' victories. The two teams with the longest total game times, Mammoth (78:45) and the Unicorns of Love (76:57), played in the first tiebreaker match for a spot in the second round of the play-in stage. Clutch Gaming had the shortest total game time (63:37) and went directly to the second tiebreaker match, which determined the first place team in Group A.

Group B

Group C

Group D

Round 2 
 Eight teams are drawn randomly into a single-elimination match, with first-place teams of each group facing second-place teams of another group.
 All matches are best-of-five.
 The first-place team chooses the side for all odd-numbered games, while the second-place team chooses the side of even-numbered games.
 The winner advances to the main event group stage as pool #3.

Match 1 
 Date and time: October 7, 13:00 CEST (UTC+02:00)

Match 2 
 Date and time: October 7, 18:00 CEST (UTC+02:00)

Match 3 
 Date and time: October 8, 13:00 CEST (UTC+02:00)

Match 4 
 Date and time: October 8, 18:00 CEST (UTC+02:00)

Group stage 
 Venue: Verti Music Hall, Berlin, Germany
 Date: October 12–20.
 Sixteen teams are drawn into four groups with four teams in each group. Teams of the same region cannot be placed in the same group.
 Double round robin, all matches are best-of-one.
 If teams have the same win–loss record and head-to-head record, a tiebreaker match is played for first or second place.
 The top two teams of each group advance to the knockout stage. The bottom two teams are eliminated.

Group A

Group B

Group C

Group D

Knockout stage 
 Eight teams are drawn into a single elimination bracket.
All matches are best-of-five.
The first-place team of each group is drawn against the second-place team of a different group.
The first-place team chooses the side for all odd-numbered games, while the second-place team chooses the side of even-numbered games.
 Teams from same group will be on opposite sides of the bracket, meaning they cannot play each other until the Finals.

Quarter-finals 
 Venue: Palacio Vistalegre, Madrid, Spain
 The winner(s) will advance to the semi-finals.

Match 1 
 Date: October 26.

Match 2 
 Date: October 26

Match 3 
 Date: October 27.

Match 4 
 Date: October 27.

Semi-finals 
 Venue: Palacio Vistalegre, Madrid, Spain
 The winner(s) will advance to the Finals.

Match 1 
 Date: November 2.

Match 2 
 Date: November 3.
 The most viewed live match in esports history, peaking at 3,985,787 viewers globally (excluding China).

Finals 

 Venue: AccorHotels Arena, Paris, France
 Date: November 10 12:00 UTC (Game 1 at 13:00 UTC) 
 The members of the winning team will lift the Summoner's Cup, earning their title as the League of Legends 2019 World Champions.

Ranking

Team ranking 

 (*) Not include tie-break games.

Regional ranking 
 The win-ratio is determined by number of won games compared the number of games played.
 Bracket stage wins are prioritized.
 (*) Does not include tiebreaker games.

Notes

References 

League of Legends World Championship
2019 multiplayer online battle arena tournaments
The Game Awards winners